Tripudia is a genus of moths of the family Noctuidae. The genus was erected by Augustus Radcliffe Grote in 1877.

Species
 Tripudia balteata Smith, 1900
 Tripudia bipars Hampson, 1910
 Tripudia catada Druce, 1889
 Tripudia chihuahua Blanchard & Knudson, 1984
 Tripudia coamona Schaus, 1940
 Tripudia damozela Dyar, 1914 (syn: Tripudia inquaesita Barnes & Benjamin, 1924)
 Tripudia dimidata Smith, 1905
 Tripudia dreptica Dyar, 1914
 Tripudia euproptopa Dyar, 1914
 Tripudia flavofasciata Grote, 1877
 Tripudia gilda Druce, 1889
 Tripudia goyanensis (Hampson, 1910) (syn: Tripudia olivacea (Grossbeck, 1917))
 Tripudia grapholithoides Möschler, 1890
 Tripudia hirasa Druce, 1889
 Tripudia icria Dyar, 1914
 Tripudia idicra Druce, 1889
 Tripudia lamina Pogue, 2009
 Tripudia ipilla Dyar, 1916
 Tripudia limbatus H. Edwards, 1881
 Tripudia luda Druce, 1898
 Tripudia luxuriosa Smith, 1900
 Tripudia millidice Dyar, 1914
 Tripudia monada Dyar, 1914
 Tripudia munna Dyar, 1916
 Tripudia nubidice Dyar, 1919
 Tripudia ochrocraspis Hampson, 1910
 Tripudia orcidia Druce, 1898
 Tripudia orthodoxica Dyar, 1914
 Tripudia paidica Dyar, 1914
 Tripudia paistion Dyar, 1914
 Tripudia paraplesia Pogue, 2009
 Tripudia periusia Dyar, 1914
 Tripudia petulans Draudt, 1928
 Tripudia pinax Dyar, 1914
 Tripudia punctifinis Hampson, 1910
 Tripudia quadrifera Zeller, 1874
 Tripudia rectangula Pogue, 2009 
 Tripudia rilla Dyar, 1913
 Tripudia rustica Dyar, 1918
 Tripudia scobina Draudt, 1928
 Tripudia semipallida Hampson, 1910
 Tripudia subterminata Hampson, 1910
 Tripudia tortricopsis Dyar, 1914
 Tripudia umbrifera Hampson, 1910
 Tripudia versutus H. Edwards, 1881

References

Acontiinae
Moth genera